Evelio González (born 11 October 1952) is a Cuban fencer. He competed in the team foil event at the 1972 Summer Olympics.

References

1952 births
Living people
Cuban male fencers
Olympic fencers of Cuba
Fencers at the 1972 Summer Olympics
20th-century Cuban people